The 1944 United States presidential election in Louisiana took place on November 7, 1944, as part of the 1944 United States presidential election. State voters chose ten representatives, or electors, to the Electoral College, who voted for president and vice president.

Incumbent Democratic President Franklin D. Roosevelt carried Louisiana in a landslide, defeating Republican New York Governor Thomas E. Dewey by a margin of 61.20%, and sweeping every parish in the state.

As of 2020, this election marks the last time that a Democratic presidential nominee has carried Bossier Parish. Plaquemines Parish and Lincoln Parish have both voted for a Democratic Presidential candidate only once since – for Bill Clinton in 1996 – whilst Caddo Parish and Claiborne Parish would not vote Democratic again until Clinton in 1992. As such, this marks the last time that any presidential candidate would carry every parish in the state.

Results

Results by parish

See also
 United States presidential elections in Louisiana

References

Louisiana
1944
1944 Louisiana elections